The 2022 Ohio Senate elections were held on November 8, 2022, to elect senators in 17 odd-numbered districts of the Ohio Senate. Members were elected in single-member constituencies to four-year terms. These elections were held concurrently with various federal and state elections, including for Governor of Ohio and the Ohio House of Representatives.

Although primary elections were originally scheduled for May 3, they were postponed to August 2 after the Supreme Court of Ohio rejected state legislative maps approved by the state redistricting commission as part of the 2020 redistricting cycle.

Predictions

Overview

Summary by district

Close races 
Seats where the margin of victory was under 10%:
 
  (gain)

Outgoing incumbents

Republicans 
 District 17: Bob Peterson was term-limited.
 District 31: Jay Hottinger was term-limited.

Democrats 
 District 9: Cecil Thomas was term-limited.
 District 11: Teresa Fedor retired to run for Lieutenant Governor of Ohio.
 District 21: Sandra Williams was term-limited.
 District 25: Kenny Yuko was term-limited.

See also 
 2022 Ohio elections

Notes

References 

Ohio Senate
Senate
Ohio Senate elections